The Man from Rome is a 2022 thriller film directed by Sergio Dow, being an adaptation of the novel by Arturo Pérez Reverte. It stars Richard Armitage, Amaia Salamanca, Fionnula Flanagan, Franco Nero and Paul Guilfoyle.

Plot 
The plot tracks Quart, a priest investigating a hacker infiltration into the Vatican.

Cast

Production 
The Man from Rome is an adaptation of the Arturo Pérez Reverte's 1995 novel , which had already spawned a 2007 television adaptation, starring Roberto Enríquez and Ana Álvarez.

A Spanish-Italian-Colombian co-production, the film is a Piel del tambor AIE (Enrique Cerezo PC), Fundación Enic Producciones and Augusto Color SRL production, with the participation of Amazon Prime Video and RTVE. Principal photography in Spain and Italy had already wrapped in February 2022. Shooting locations in Seville included the Plaza de San Francisco. Aitor Mantxola worked as a cinematographer whereas Pablo Blanco and Miguel Ángel Prieto took over film editing. Roque Baños composed the music.

Release 
The film had a pre-screening in Seville on 13 October 2022. It was theatrically released in Spain on 21 October 2022.

Reception 
Manuel J. Lombardo of Diario de Sevilla rated the film 1 out of 5 stars, considering that the film is conceived as a "stiff, superficial and formulaic entertainment for sleepy audiences, a cinema of automatic manners, [with] cliché characters and [a] second-rate international cast".

Raquel Hernández Luján of HobbyConsolas rated the film with 75 points ("good"), deeming the film to be "very enjoyable and easier to digest than the novel it is based on".

Oti Rodríguez Marchante of ABC rated the film 3 out of 5 stars, praising the ability to fit all the novel's plots, subplots and characters into just an hour and a half of footage.

Accolades 

|-
| align = "center" | 2023 || 31st Actors and Actresses Union Awards || Best Film Actor in a Minor Role || Unax Ugalde ||  || 
|}

See also 
 List of Spanish films of 2022

References 

2020s Spanish films
2020s Italian films
Spanish thriller films
Italian thriller films
Colombian thriller films
Films scored by Roque Baños
Films shot in the province of Seville
Films shot in Italy
Films based on Spanish novels
2020s English-language films
Enrique Cerezo PC films